The Bucellarian Theme (Boukellarion thema), more properly known as the Theme of the Bucellarians (thema Boukellariōn) was a Byzantine theme (a military-civilian province) in northern Asia Minor (modern Turkey). It was created around the middle of the 8th century, comprising most of the ancient region of Paphlagonia and parts of Galatia and Phrygia.

History
The theme was established sometime after 743 and before 767 by the Emperor Constantine V (r. 741–775), following the suppression of the revolt of Artabasdos, the Count of the Opsikion. The new theme, along with that of the Optimatoi was split off from the Opsikion as formed part of the Emperor's policy to reduce the latter's power. The name of the theme derives from the late Roman Bucellarii, elite cavalry troops of Gothic or Roman origin, often found as privately recruited bodyguard troops. By the early 7th century, they formed an elite division in the Opsikion field force, coming under a domestikos before their elevation to a full theme. The strategos of the Bucellarians is attested for the first time in 767, providing a terminus ante quem for its creation. His headquarters were at Ancyra, the former capital of Opsikion, and he belonged to the second tier of strategoi with an annual salary of 30 pounds of gold. According to Arab geographers, he commanded some 8,000 troops. The court ranks of the Bucellarian strategoi ranged from the mid-level spatharios to the higher protospatharios, with a single occurrence of the more exalted patrikios in the 10th century. Claudiopolis is the only attested base of one of the theme's tourmai. Despite it being originally a cavalry theme (thema kaballarikon), the Bucellarians, as well as the later Paphlagonian theme, also included a small fleet, active in the Black Sea. The "katepano of the Bucellarians and the Paphlagonians", whose seal is attested in the 10th century, was the commander of this naval contingent. However, evidence points to the fact that the 10th-century fleet was composed of merchantmen and transport ships, not warships.

Initially, the theme stretched from the Black Sea coast to the central Anatolian plateau, bordering the Optimatoi and the rump of the Opsikion in the west, the Anatolic theme in the south, and the Armeniac theme in the east. In the 9th century, however, probably c. 820, the northeastern half of the theme was detached and formed, perhaps with some territory from the Armeniac theme, the new theme of Paphlagonia. Its extent was further reduced under Emperor Leo VI the Wise (r. 886–912), when eight southern and southeastern banda were removed to form part of the new themes of Cappadocia (around Lake Tuz) and Charsianon (east of the Halys River). In the 9th century, it comprised two towns and thirteen fortresses, while five towns are recorded in the 10th century. The theme survived until it was overrun by the Seljuk Turks following the Battle of Manzikert in 1071. The name Boukellariōn, however, survived as a geographical designation in Byzantine sources up until 1263.

References

Sources

Further reading

States and territories established in the 8th century
Byzantine Paphlagonia
Themes of the Byzantine Empire